Lady Soul is the twelfth studio album by American singer Aretha Franklin released in early 1968, by Atlantic Records.

Eric Clapton plays guitar on the album.

Background
Lady Soul was Franklin's third R&B chart-topper and reached number two on the Billboard 200, tying with I Never Loved a Man the Way I Love You for her highest-charting album on the pop chart. The album also included some of her biggest hit singles: "Chain of Fools" (#2 Pop), and "(You Make Me Feel Like) A Natural Woman" (#8 Pop), and "(Sweet Sweet Baby) Since You've Been Gone" (#5 Pop). It eventually sold well over a million copies in the United States alone. The album was reissued on Rhino Records in a deluxe edition in 1995.

Gospel/R&B singer Cissy Houston (mother of Whitney Houston) and her group the Sweet Inspirations are credited as background vocals on several tracks, along with Aretha's sisters Carolyn and Erma Franklin. Eric Clapton, at the time a member of the band Cream, is credited as the guitarist on the track "Good to Me as I Am to You".

Lady Soul peaked at #1, #2 and #3 on Billboard's Black Albums, Pop Albums and Jazz Albums charts respectively. The single "Ain't No Way" – B-Side of "Since You've Been Gone (Sweet, Sweet, Baby)" – peaked at #9 on the Black Singles chart and #16 on the Pop Singles chart.

Legacy
The album was included in the book 1001 Albums You Must Hear Before You Die.

In 2003 the TV network VH1 named Lady Soul the 41st greatest album of all time. In 2003 and 2012, it ranked at number 85 on Rolling Stones list "The 500 Greatest Albums of All Time". It rose to number 75 in a 2020 reboot of the list. The album was rated the 29th best album of the 1960s by Pitchfork.

Track listing
All tracks produced by Jerry Wexler and Recording engineered by Tom Dowd.

Notes

 Chain of Fools (Unedited Version) was originally issued on the 1973 compilation album The Best of Aretha Franklin.

Charts

Singles

Note: Numbers in italic (following original single release information) denote peak positions on Billboard's "Top/Best Selling R&B Singles" and "Hot 100" charts respectively - courtesy BPI Communications and Joel Whitburn's Record Research Publications.

Personnel 
 Aretha Franklin – vocals, backing vocals, piano
 Eric Clapton, Bobby Womack, Joe South, Jimmy Johnson – guitar
 Tommy Cogbill – bass guitar
 Spooner Oldham – piano, electric piano, organ 
 Bernie Glow, Joe Newman, Melvin Lastie – trumpet
 Tony Studd – trombone
 King Curtis – tenor saxophone
 Frank Wess, Seldon Powell – flute, tenor saxophone
 Haywood Henry – baritone saxophone
 The Sweet Inspirations - backing vocals
 Carolyn Franklin – backing vocals
 Cissy Houston – backing vocals
 Roger Hawkins, Gene Chrisman – drums
 Warren Smith – vibraphone

See also
List of number-one R&B albums of 1968 (U.S.)

References

1968 albums
Aretha Franklin albums
Albums produced by Jerry Wexler
Atlantic Records albums
Rhino Records albums
Albums conducted by Ralph Burns
Albums arranged by Arif Mardin